All Shall Fall is the eighth studio album by Norwegian black metal band Immortal. The album was released in Europe on 25 September 2009 and in the US on 6 October 2009. It is the only album to feature bassist Apollyon and the last to feature vocalist/guitarist Abbath Doom Occulta.

Recording and production 
In January 2008, Immortal started rehearsing and writing new material for their 8th studio album. After spending much time performing live that year, the band entered both Grieghallen and Abyss studios in April 2009 to start recording the album. A month later the band already completed recording the album and announced the album's title. In June, Terrorizer was given the opportunity to listen to the just-recorded album and posted an exclusive track-by-track breakdown.

Track listing

Personnel 

Immortal
 Abbath Doom Occulta – guitars, vocals
 Apollyon – bass
 Horgh – drums

Additional personnel
 Are Mundal – "Unearthly Kingdom" intro
 Demonaz Doom Occulta – lyrics
 Jonas Kjellgren – mastering
 Pär Olofsson – cover design, artwork
 Peter Beste - photography
 Peter Tägtgren – production, mixing
 Pytten – engineering

Charts

References

External links 
 Immortal Discography
 "All Shall Fall" at discogs

Immortal (band) albums
2009 albums
Albums with cover art by Pär Olofsson
Albums produced by Peter Tägtgren